Old Reliable may refer to: 

The Old Reliable, 1951 novel
Old Reliable Tape and Picture Company, a gay pornography company
Old Reliable Theatre Tavern
Nickname of The Cleveland Gazette
Nickname of Tommy Henrich
Nickname of Louisville and Nashville Railroad
Nickname of RMS Olympic
Nickname of Redstone Test Stand